The Samsung SCH U960 (or "Rogue") is a CDMA touchscreen side-slider cell phone made by Samsung. The phone features a QWERTY keyboard, Bluetooth, MP3 Player, GPS, and a 3 MP camera with Geo Tagging. It uses Verizon's EVDO Rev A data network. The Rogue runs Samsung’s TouchWiz UI with a widget bar on the side (or the bottom when the phone is in landscape mode). Social networking widgets including those from Facebook, MySpace, YouTube, Twitter, and Photobucket are widely represented on the widget bar. The Rogue also has widgets for most commonly used applications like calendar, favorite contacts and tools such as Bluetooth and settings. Like other TouchWiz phones, the user can drag widgets to the phone’s today screen and select which widgets populate the widget bar. The phone does not support downloading additional widgets.

In the U.S., the Rogue was released on September 8, 2009.

Display and menus
A resistive AMOLED touchscreen of 3.1 inches (7.874 cm) is included with the Rogue and the screen's native resolution is 480 x 800 pixels at 262,000 colors. Besides producing a brighter, more colorful image, AMOLED screen technology uses less power, allowing for longer battery life. 

Samsung's TouchWiz UI, which supports "drag and drop" capabilities, is used by the Rogue.

Phone calls and phone book
The Rogue can also store up to 1,000 contact names with a photo ID, email, address, work, and mobile phone numbers, fax numbers, an IM screen name, information (like appearance), and birthday. The Rogue has Nuance voice command and voice dialing software.

Camera
The Rogue has an integrated 3.0-megapixel camera with flash, self-portrait mirror, camcorder and digital zoom. There is a dedicated camera and video key on the handset for quick access to camera features. The handset comes with numerous "pre-shot" options include single, multi-shot, panorama, mosaic or frame shooting; flash; brightness adjustment; timer; auto-focus; auto-shot; fine, normal or economy photo quality; white balance; metering and ISO; contrast; saturation; sharpness; normal, black and white, antique, aqua or negative color effects; and several resolution options from 2048 x 1536 px down to 320 x 240 px.

Once a photo is taken, users can add an effect (grayscale, sepia, green, blue, sketch, emboss, soft-glamorous, soft-elegant, soft-charismatic, spring sun, dawn, fright, cinema-normal, cinema-black and white, cinema-old), merge, rotate or flip, resize, adjust for weather or lighting conditions, copy and paste, save or trash the photo, or view it in a slide show. The photo can also be drawn on with a "pen", and items of selectable color, thickness and shape can be placed on the photo.

As a camcorder, recording features include an optional flash for recording, adjustable brightness, selectable size/resolution (storage or sending size), timer, white balance adjustment, color effects, and quality adjustment.

To edit videos, a "Video Wizard" splices and merges files into one video, adjusts volume, edits sound, trims, splits or copies video, inserts text, or adds an effect (black and white,sepia ,posterise ,solarize, blur, sharpen, noise, emboss).

Videos can be sent, saved, erased, viewed in a slide show, or saved as a project.

Ringtones and audio playback
The Samsung Rogue has a built-in speakerphone, a 3.5 mm stereo audio jack, Bluetooth A2DP and V CAST Music services. The phone has a microSD slot for additional storage that supports cards up to 16 GB. The built-in media player can play music in MP3, AAC, AAC+, eAAC+ as well as WMA formats. The music player is not able to multi-task.

The phone uses MP3 polyphonic and truetone ringtones and has vibrate options.

Specs
Samsung Rogue specifications

Sources
 Samsung Rogue at VerizonWireless.com 
 Samsung Rogue at Samsung.com, archived from the original on September 23, 2009
 Samsung Rogue review at CNET
 Samsung Rogue Unofficial user group, archived from the original on August 18, 2009

References

SCH-U960
Mobile phones introduced in 2009